Thou shalt not kill (LXX), You shall not murder or You shall not kill (KJV), is a moral imperative included as one of the Ten Commandments in the Torah.

The imperative not to kill is in the context of unlawful killing resulting in bloodguilt.

Hebrew Bible

Retzach 
The Hebrew verb  (r-ṣ-ḥ, also transliterated retzach, ratzákh, ratsakh etc.) is the word in the original text that is translated as "murder", but it has a wider range of meanings, generally describing destructive activity, including meanings "to break, to dash to pieces" as well as "to slay, kill, murder".

According to the Book of Numbers, killing anyone outside the context of war with a weapon, or in unarmed combat, is considered retzach. If the killing is accidental, the accused must flee to one of the cities of refuge—and remain in that city until the high priest dies, or the "revenger of blood" can kill the accused with no legal repercussions. The Bible never uses the word retzach in conjunction with war.

The act of slaying itself, regardless of questions of blood guilt, is expressed with the verb n-k-h "to strike, smite, hit, beat, slay, kill". The Covenant Code and Holiness Code both prescribe the death penalty for people that commit n-k-h.

The commandment against murder can be viewed as a legal issue governing human relationships, noting that the first four commandments relate strongly to man's duty to God and that the latter six commandments describe duties toward humans. The commandment against murder can also be viewed as based in respect for God himself.  "The voice of your brother's blood is crying to me from the ground. And now you are cursed from the ground, which has opened its mouth to receive your brother's blood from your hand."  (ESV)

The Genesis narrative also portrays the prohibition of shedding innocent blood as an important aspect of God's covenant with Noah.

The Torah portrays murder as a capital crime and describes a number of details in the moral understanding and legal implementation of consequences. The Priestly Code allowed the victim's next of kin (avenger of blood) to exact retribution on the suspect; but the accused could seek sanctuary in a city of refuge. The right of the avenger of blood to such revenge ceased, upon the death of the person who was the Jewish High Priest at the time of the crime.

Another verb meaning "to kill, slay, murder, destroy, ruin" is h-r-g, used of Cain slaying Abel in Genesis 4:8. Eliezer Segal observes that the Septuagint uses the term harag, and that Augustine of Hippo recognized that this did not extend to wars or capital punishment. Most subsequent translations follow Jerome's Vulgate. While Jerome had access to Jewish scholars, "even the Jewish translators were not unanimous in maintaining a consistent distinctions between the various Hebrew roots." Jerome's choice of the word occidere (to kill) reflects the broader range of meanings.

In a more modern analysis, Wilma Ann Bailey also finds a broader application of the word retzach.

Justified killing: due consequence for crime
The Torah and Hebrew Bible made clear distinctions between the shedding of innocent blood versus killing as the due consequence of a crime.  A number of sins were considered to be worthy of the death penalty including murder, incest, bearing false witness (perjury) in proceedings of a capital charge, adultery, idolatry, bestiality, child sacrifice to pagan gods, cursing a parent, fortune-telling, homosexuality, and other sins.

For example, the Exodus narrative describes the people as having turned to idolatry with the golden calf while Moses was on the mountain receiving the law from God. When Moses came down, he commanded the Levites to take up the sword against their brothers and companions and neighbors. The Levites obeyed and killed about three thousand men who had sinned in worship of the golden calf.  As a result, Moses said that the Levites had received a blessing that day at the cost of son and brother. On a separate occasion, a blasphemer was stoned to death because he blasphemed the name of the Lord (Yahweh) with a curse.

The Hebrew Bible has many other examples of sinners being put to death as due consequence for crimes. Achan is put to death by Joshua because he caused defeat of Israel's army by taking some of the plunder and hiding it in his tent. David ordered that an Amalekite be put to death because he claimed to have killed King Saul. Following the advice of his father, Solomon ordered that Joab be killed:

The biblical refrain for those justly executed as due punishment for crimes is that "their blood will be on their own heads." This expresses the idea that those guilty of certain actions have brought the shedding of blood upon themselves, and those carrying out due punishment do not bear bloodguilt.

Justified killing: in warfare

The ancient Hebrew texts make a distinction between the moral and legal prohibition of shedding of innocent blood and killing in battle. Rabbi Marc Gellman explains the distinction between "harag" (killing) and "ratzah" (murder) and notes the different moral connotations. "...there is wide moral agreement (not complete agreement) that some forms of killing are morally just, and killing an enemy combatant during wartime is one of them." For example, the Torah prohibits murder, but sanctions killing in legitimate battle. The Bible often praises the exploits of soldiers against enemies in legitimate battle.  One of David's mighty men is credited with killing eight hundred men with the spear, and Abishai is credited with killing three hundred men.

The 613 Mitzvot extend the notion of lawful killing to the nations that inhabited the Promised Land, commanding to exterminate them completely.
Deuteronomy 20:10–18 establishes rules on killing civilians in warfare:
the population of cities outside of the Promised Land, if they surrender, should be made tributaries and left alive (20:10–11)
those cities outside of the Promised Land that resist should be besieged, and once they fall, the male population should be exterminated, but the women and children should be left alive (20:12–15)
of those cities that were within the Promised Land, however, everybody was to be killed.

Justified killing: intruder in the home at night
As described in the Torah, the ancient understanding of the prohibition of murder made an exception for legitimate self-defense.  A home defender who struck and killed a thief caught in the act of breaking in at night was not guilty of bloodshed.  "If a thief is caught breaking in and is struck so that he dies, the defender is not guilty of bloodshed; but if it happens after sunrise, he is guilty of bloodshed."

Jewish doctrine

Jewish law views the shedding of innocent blood very seriously, and lists murder as one of three sins (along with idolatry and sexual immorality) that fall under the category of yehareg ve'al ya'avor, meaning "One should let himself be killed rather than violate it." Jewish law enumerates 613 Mitzvot, or commandments, including prohibition of murder and a number of other commandments related to the preserving of human life and administration of justice in cases of shedding of innocent blood.

On the subject of manslaughter ("thou shalt not kill"), the rabbinic authority Nachmanides was one of the few who enumerated a negative commandment prohibiting this lesser offense.

Life is considered very precious, even sacred by Jewish teaching.  The Talmud cites the prohibition of shedding innocent blood in Genesis 9:6 as the reason why the death penalty should be carried out against non-Jews as well as Jews, and while faithful Jews are required to obey 613 Mitzvot, gentiles are only obliged to obey the seven Noahide laws, which include the prohibition of murder and establishment of a justice system to administer law honestly. Rabbi Dr. Azriel Rosenfeld offers a representative modern summary of Jewish teaching regarding the command not to murder.

In the Talmud, Genesis 9:5 is interpreted as a prohibition against killing oneself, and Genesis 9:6 is "cited in support for the prohibition of abortion."

According to the Mishnah (older part of the Talmud), it is said of Hillel the Elder that he saw a skull that was floating on top of the water and he said (to it): "Since you drowned [others, others] drowned you. And in the end, those that drowned you will be drowned." From Rabbi Tarfon and Rabbi Akiva it is stated in the Mishnah: "If we were on the Sanhedrin, nobody would have ever been executed."

According to conservative rabbi Louis Ginzberg, every slain man who, because of murdering, died before their time shall stay in outer part of Sheol until the course of the time predestined them is run.

New Testament doctrine

The New Testament is in agreement that murder is a grave moral evil, and maintains the Old Testament view of bloodguilt. Jesus himself repeats and expands upon the commandment, "Do not murder." The New Testament depicts Jesus as explaining that murder, as well as other sins, comes from the heart.

The New Testament acknowledges the just and proper role of civil government in maintaining justice and punishing evildoers, even to the point of "bearing the sword." One criminal on the cross contrasts his death as due punishment with Jesus' death as an innocent man. When Jesus appeared before Pilate, both Pilate and the crowd recognize the principles of bloodguilt.  There is no indication in the New Testament that it is unjust, immoral, or inappropriate for secular civil governments to execute those guilty of shedding innocent blood.

Like the Old Testament, the New Testament seems to depict the lawful use of force by soldiers in legitimate battles as justified. The profession of soldier is used as a metaphor by Paul exhorting the Ephesians to "put on the full armor of God." Cornelius, the Roman centurion, is portrayed as a righteous and God-fearing man. Jesus praises the faith of a Roman centurion on the occasion of healing the centurion's servant, and states that he has not found such great faith even in Israel. When John the Baptist was preaching repentance and baptizing penitent sinners in the Jordan River, soldiers came to John and asked for specific instructions regarding their repentance.  John the Baptist did not demand that the soldiers renounce their profession, instead he exhorted them to be content with their pay.

Jesus was not condoning violence as the very next verse confirms it was to satisfy the prophecy of Isaiah 53 when he told his disciples to buy a sword if they do not have one, "now if you have a purse, take it, and also a bag; and if you don't have a sword, sell your cloak and buy one." Jesus was quick to correct his servant for the improper use of the sword in cutting off the ear of the high-priest's servant.

In John 8:7 Jesus replied to the question of capital punishment because of adultery to let him who is without sin cast the first stone – and no one did.

Catholic doctrine

This commandment demands respect for human life and is more accurately translated as "thou shalt not murder." Killing may, under limited circumstances, be justified within Catholicism. The basis of all Catholic teaching about the fifth commandment is the "sanctity of life", which is often contrasted with the "quality of life" to some extent. The Church is actively involved in the public debates over abortion, capital punishment and euthanasia, and encourages believers to support legislation and politicians it describes as pro-life.

With regard to this commandment the Roman Catechism states:

Abortion 

According to the Catechism of the Catholic Church:

The Catechism states that abortion is a grave moral evil because the act takes an innocent human life: human life must be respected and protected absolutely from the moment of conception. From the first moment of his existence, "a human being must be recognized as having the rights of a person – among which is the inviolable right of every innocent being to life."

Capital punishment 

Legitimate defense is depicted as justifiable, even if the defender deals his aggressor a lethal blow.  However, a person should not use more force than necessary to repel an attack.  The legitimate defense of persons and societies should not be considered as an exception to the prohibition of murdering the innocent: the preservation of innocent life is seen as the intended outcome.  Injury or death to the aggressor is not the intended outcome, it is the unfortunate consequence of using necessary force to repel an imminent threat.

Legitimate defense can be not only a right but a grave duty for one who is responsible for the lives of others. The Catechism says: "The defense of the common good requires that an unjust aggressor be rendered unable to cause harm. For this reason, those who legitimately hold authority also have the right to use arms to repel aggressors against the civil community entrusted to their responsibility."

The Catechism teaches that legitimate public authority has the right and duty to punish criminals proportionally to the gravity of the offense to safeguard the public good.  Nonlethal means are preferred, if these are sufficient to defend and protect people's safety. Recourse to the death penalty was not excluded in the past. In August 2018 the Congregation for the Doctrine of the Faith with the approval of Pope Francis changed paragraph 2267 of the Catechism of the Catholic Church and declared that the death penalty is always regarded as inadmissible. An Ohio prosecutor publicly declared that he disagrees with that, while Catholic US scholars drafted an appeal against the change and declared it "scandalous". 
Recourse to the death penalty on the part of legitimate authority, following a fair trial, was long considered an appropriate response to the gravity of certain crimes and an acceptable, albeit extreme, means of safeguarding the common good.
Today, however, there is an increasing awareness that the dignity of the person is not lost even after the commission of very serious crimes. In addition, a new understanding has emerged of the significance of penal sanctions imposed by the state. Lastly, more effective systems of detention have been developed, which ensure the due protection of citizens but, at the same time, do not definitively deprive the guilty of the possibility of redemption.

In February 2016 Pope Francis called for the suspension of the death penalty for the duration of the Holy Year "because modern means existed to 'efficiently repress crime without definitively denying the person who committed it the possibility of rehabilitating themselves."

Suicide, euthanasia, health, intoxication 
Catholic teaching strictly prohibits euthanasia and suicide as violations of the commandment, "You shall not kill." Recognizing life and health as precious gifts from God, adherents are encouraged to avoid excess of food, tobacco, alcohol, and medications.  Endangering others with excess speed or drunkenness on the roadway incurs grave guilt. The use of drugs, except on strictly therapeutic grounds is a grave offense. Clandestine production and trafficking in drugs constitute "direct co-operation in evil."

War and self-defense 
The Catholic Catechism urges prayer for the avoidance of war.  All citizens and governments are obliged to work toward the avoidance of war.  However, it recognizes that governments cannot be denied the lawful right to self-defense, once all peace efforts have failed.  The use of legitimate defense by a military force is considered grave and therefore subject to rigorous considerations of moral legitimacy.  Elements of just war theory are explicitly enumerated in the Catechism:

the damage inflicted by the aggressor on the nation or community of nations must be lasting, grave, and certain;
all other means of putting an end to it must have been shown to be impractical or ineffective;
 there must be serious prospects of success;
the use of arms must not produce evils and disorders graver than the evil to be eliminated. The power of modern means of destruction weighs very heavily in evaluating this condition.

Reformation and Post-Reformation doctrines

Lutheranism
Martin Luther summarized the commandment against shedding innocent blood as grounded in the fear and love of God, and as having both positive and negative aspects: negative in that we must neither harm nor hurt our neighbor's body; positive in that we must help our neighbor and care for him when he is ill.

In a more detailed teaching, Martin Luther explains that God and government are not constrained by the commandment not to kill, but that God has delegated his authority in punishing evildoers to the government.  The prohibition of killing is forbidden to the individual in his relation to anyone else, and not to the government.

Today, the Lutheran Church of Australia recognises conscientious objection to war as biblically legitimate. It has declared, "The church...  accepts the validity of a  person's refusal to engage in military service if he or she is convinced that participation in a  military conflict amounts to the transgression of God's commandment  'You shall not kill'."

Calvinism
In The Institutes of the Christian Religion, John Calvin viewed the purport of this commandment as the safety of all being entrusted to each person.  All violence and injustice, and every kind of harm from which our neighbor's body suffers is thereby prohibited.  Christians are therefore required to faithfully perform that which is within their power to defend the life of their neighbor, be vigilant in warding off harm, and assist in removing danger when it comes. Calvin asserts that the same rule must also be applied in regulating the mind against anger, arguing that since God sees the heart and mind, the commandment against shedding innocent blood also prohibits murder of the heart and requires a sincere desire to preserve our brother's life.  The hand does not commit the murder unless it is conceived by the mind under the influence of wrath and hatred.  According to Calvin, where wrath and hatred dwell, there is an inclination to do mischief, quoting the Bible, "whosoever hateth his brother is a murderer"(1 John 3:15) and "whosoever is angry with his brother without a cause shall be in danger of the judgement" (Gospel of Matthew 5:22).

John Calvin also makes a case that the command against shedding blood is founded both in the creation of man in the image of God and in the need for a man to cherish his own flesh.

Matthew Henry considered the commandment against killing to apply to both one's own life as well as the life of one's neighbor and considered it to apply not only to causing of death but also to prohibit any thing unjustly hurtful to or injurious to the health, ease, and life of one's own body or the body of any other person. He also ties the commandment against bloodshed back to the command to Noah, and he sees it as a command applying to the individual against his neighbor, but not against killing in lawful war, for one's own necessary defense, or against the government instituting due punishments for criminal offenses.  He portrays lying in wait for the blood of the innocent as a grave offense against human dignity as one of the fundamental laws of nature.

Many modern Calvinists, such as André Trocmé and Jacques Ellul, have been pacifists.

Today, the orthodox position of conservative Calvinists is Christian pacifism.

Anglicanism
Lambeth Conference 1930 Resolution 25 declares that, "The Conference affirms that war as a method of settling international disputes is incompatible with the teaching and example of our Lord Jesus Christ." The 1948, 1958 and 1968 conferences re-ratified this position. The Anglican Pacifist Fellowship lobbies the various dioceses of the Anglican Communion to uphold this agreed position.

See also

 Seven Laws of Noah
 Sin

References

Further reading

 The Jewish Study Bible, Tanakh Translation. 2004. Berlin, Adele; Brettler, Marc Zvi; Fishbane, Michael, eds. Jewish Publication Society, New York: Oxford University Press. 
 Matthew Henry’s Concise Commentary on the Whole Bible, Bible Commentary - Matthew Henry Consise  (accessed 2 September 2009)
 The Holy Bible, English Standard Version. 2007. Crossway Bibles, Wheaton, IL. 
 New Jerusalem Bible. 1985. Bible  (accessed 28 August 2009)
 The NIV Study Bible. 1995. Barker, Kenneth, Burdick, Donald; Stek, John; Wessel, Walter; Youngblood, Ronald, eds. Zondervan. Grand Rapids, MI, USA 
 U.S. Catholic Church. Catechism of the Catholic Church. 2003. Doubleday Religion.    (accessed 1 September 2009)

External links
 Tanakh (Holy Scriptures), Jewish Publication Society (JPS) 1917
Explanation of Torah, Mishnah, Talmud versions
  Matthew Henry’s Concise Commentary on the Whole Bible
 John Wesley’s notes on the Bible
John Calvin’s commentary on the Bible

Ten Commandments
Homicide
Christian nonviolence
Biblical phrases
Murder